Timothy Buchanan (born May 26, 1946) is a former American football linebacker. He attended college at the University of Hawaiʻi at Mānoa and played for the Cincinnati Bengals for one season, where he was a backup for Bill Bergey.

References

External links
Tim Buchanan at Pro Football Reference

1946 births
Living people
Hawaii Rainbow Warriors football players
Cincinnati Bengals players
American football linebackers